Yegor Vyacheslavovich Kiryakov (born 4 February 1974) is a former Russian professional footballer.

Club career
He made his professional debut in the Soviet Second League B in 1991 for FC Spartak Oryol.

Personal life
He is the younger brother of Sergei Kiriakov.

Honours
 Russian Premier League bronze: 1992.

References

1974 births
Sportspeople from Oryol
Living people
Soviet footballers
Russian footballers
Association football midfielders
FC Dynamo Moscow players
FC Chernomorets Novorossiysk players
FC Kuban Krasnodar players
FC Oryol players
Russian Premier League players